Flowerdew Macindoe (14 February 1865 – 11 October 1932) is a former Scotland international rugby union player.

Rugby Union career

Amateur career

Macindoe played for Glasgow Academicals.

Provincial career

In 1884 and 1885, he was capped by Glasgow District for their inter-city match against Edinburgh District. He also played for Glasgow District against the North of Scotland District on 2 January 1886.

In 1885 and 1886 he played for West of Scotland District against East of Scotland District.

International career

He was capped twice for Scotland in 1886.

Family

His father was George Park Macindoe (1822-1897) and his mother was Margaret Gray Flowerdew.

References

1865 births
1932 deaths
Scottish rugby union players
Scotland international rugby union players
Glasgow Academicals rugby union players
Rugby union players from Hamilton, South Lanarkshire
West of Scotland District (rugby union) players
Glasgow District (rugby union) players
Rugby union fullbacks